The Stelmužė Oak is an English (Pedunculate) oak tree which grows in the former Stelmužė Manor park by Stelmužė [stεɫˈmʊʒeː] village, Lithuania. 

The oak measures 3.5 m in diameter and 13 m in girth at its widest part; being 2.8 m. and 9.58 m at waist level. The oak reaches 23 m in height with only side branches remaining alive. It is believed to be at least 1,500 years old, possibly, as much as 2,000 years old; this makes it the oldest oak in Lithuania and one of the oldest in Europe. However, exact age measurements are difficult, as the inner part of the trunk has been removed.

In 1960 the oak was declared a natural monument and included in the list of protected objects in Lithuania.

According to legend, Perkūnas was worshipped beneath this tree by pagans.

See also
 List of individual trees
 List of oldest trees

References

Individual oak trees
Individual trees in Lithuania
Oldest trees
Landmarks in Lithuania
Natural monuments of Lithuania
Zarasai District Municipality